Marco Dall'Aquila (c.1480 – after 1538) was a Venetian lutenist and composer known for musical forms called polyphonic ricercars. He was born in L'Aquila but lived and worked in Venice. He often performed at concerts in the houses of nobles in the city, and in 1505 he published Tabullatura et rasone de metter ogni canto in liuto.

On 11 March 1505, Dall'Aquila also received a grant for a petition where he claimed to have developed a method of printing tablature which he could use to score any lute composition into tablature. In the petition for the grant, he also asked for a ban on other printing methods and imports of music scored by other methods, and for a portion of penalties paid for infringement. However, no printed editions demonstrating his method survive.

Works
Dall'Aquila's music is widely available as recordings by contemporary lutenists. Selected works include:

Ricercar No.16, for lute
Ricercar No.33, for lute
Ricercar
Il est Bel et Bon
Ricervar Lautre Jour, No 101
Nous Bergiers
La Traditora, No 3
La Traditora, No 2
La Battaglia (after Janequin)
La cara cosa, for lute (No 36f)
Ricercar/Fantasia for lute
Ricercar for lute (No 24)
Ricercar for lute (No 16)
La traditora, for lute (No 38)
Priambolo for lute (No 71)
Amy souffrez, for lute (No 62)
Ricercar for lute (No 19)
Ricercar for lute (No 101)
Ricercar/Fantasia for lute (No.26)
Ricercar for lute (No 28)
Ricercar for lute (No 70)
Ricercar for lute (No 22)
Ricercar for lute (No 18)
Ricercar for lute (No 15)
Ricercar/Fantasia for lute
Ricercar for lute (No.26)
Ricercar for lute (No.17)
Ricercar for lute (No.13)
Ricercar for lute (No.20)
Fantasia for lute (No.27)
Ricercar for lute (No.6)
Fantasia for lute (No.9)
Pioverin, for lute
Il Marchese di Saluzzo, for lute
Fantasia for lute (No.28)
Ricercar for lute (No.4)
Ricercar for lute (No.2)
Ricercar for lute (No.5)
Pomo, for lute
Pavana for lute
Piva for lute
Tocha tocha la canella, for lute
Fantasia for lute (No.7)
Carnalesca, for lute
Donne impresteme il vostro burato da buratare la mia farina, for lute

References

External links
Marco dall'Aquila - Ricercar 17 & 15 - Paul O'Dette from YouTube.
Dall' Aquila - Music for Lute - Sandro Volta - Brilliant Classics from YouTube.

Date of birth unknown
Date of death unknown
Renaissance composers
Italian classical composers
Italian male classical composers
Composers for lute
Year of birth uncertain